Many Catholics have made significant contributions to the development of science and mathematics from the Middle Ages to today. These scientists include Galileo Galilei, René Descartes, Louis Pasteur, Blaise Pascal, André-Marie Ampère, Charles-Augustin de Coulomb, Pierre de Fermat, Antoine Laurent Lavoisier, Alessandro Volta, Augustin-Louis Cauchy, Pierre Duhem, Jean-Baptiste Dumas, Alois Alzheimer, Georgius Agricola and Christian Doppler.

Lay Catholic scientists

A

 Maria Gaetana Agnesi (1718–1799) – mathematician who wrote on differential and integral calculus
 Georgius Agricola (1494–1555) – father of mineralogy
Ulisse Aldrovandi (1522–1605) – father of natural history
 Rudolf Allers (1883–1963) – Austrian psychiatrist; the only Catholic member of Sigmund Freud's first group, later a critic of Freudian psychoanalysis
 Alois Alzheimer (1864–1915) – credited with identifying the first published case of presenile dementia, which is now known as Alzheimer's disease
 André-Marie Ampère (1775–1836) – one of the main discoverers of electromagnetism
 Leopold Auenbrugger (1722–1809) – first to use percussion as a diagnostic technique in medicine
 Adrien Auzout (1622–1691) – astronomer who contributed to the development of the telescopic micrometer
 Amedeo Avogadro (1776–1856) – Italian scientist noted for contributions to molecular theory and Avogadro's Law
 Francisco J. Ayala (1934–2023) – Spanish-American biologist and philosopher at the University of California, Irvine .

B
 Jacques Babinet (1794–1872) – French physicist, mathematician, and astronomer who is best known for his contributions to optics 
 Stefan Banach (1892-1945) – Polish mathematician, founder of modern functional analysis
 Stephen M. Barr (1953–) – professor emeritus in the Department of Physics and Astronomy at the University of Delaware and a member of its Bartol Research Institute; founding president of the Society of Catholic Scientists
 Joachim Barrande (1799–1883) – French geologist and paleontologist who studied fossils from the Lower Palaeozoic rocks of Bohemia 
 Laura Bassi (1711–1778) – physicist at the University of Bologna and Chair in experimental physics at the Bologna Institute of Sciences, the first woman to be offered a professorship at a European university
 Antoine César Becquerel (1788–1878) – pioneer in the study of electric and luminescent phenomena
 Henri Becquerel (1852–1908) – awarded the Nobel Prize in physics for his co-discovery of radioactivity
 Carlo Beenakker (1960–) – professor at Leiden University and leader of the university's mesoscopic physics group, established in 1992.
 Giovanni Battista Belzoni (1778–1823) – prolific Italian explorer and pioneer archaeologist of Egyptian antiquities
 Pierre-Joseph van Beneden (1809–1894) – Belgian zoologist and paleontologist who established one of the world's first marine laboratories and aquariums
 Claude Bernard (1813–1878) – physiologist who helped to apply scientific methodology to medicine
 Jacques Philippe Marie Binet (1786–1856) – mathematician known for Binet's formula and his contributions to number theory
 Jean-Baptiste Biot (1774–1862) – physicist who established the reality of meteorites and studied polarization of light
 Evelyn Livingston Billings (1918–2013) – Australian pediatrician; co-developed the Billings ovulation method with her husband, John Billings
 John Billings (1918–2007) – Australian neurologist; co-developed the Billings ovulation method with his wife, Evelyn Livingston Billings
 John Birmingham (astronomer) (1816–1884) – Irish astronomer who discovered the recurrent nova T Coronae Borealis and revised and extended Schjellerup's Catalogue of Red Stars
 Henri Marie Ducrotay de Blainville (1777–1850) – zoologist and anatomist who coined the term paleontology and described several new species of reptiles
 Giovanni Alfonso Borelli (1608–1679) – often referred to as the father of modern biomechanics
 Raoul Bott (1923–2005) – mathematician known for numerous basic contributions to geometry in its broad sense
 Marcella Boveri (1863–1950) – biologist and first woman to graduate from the Massachusetts Institute of Technology
 Theodor Boveri (1862–1915) – first to hypothesize the cellular processes that cause cancer
 Louis Braille (1809–1852) – inventor of the Braille reading and writing system
 Edouard Branly (1844–1940) – inventor and physicist known for his involvement in wireless telegraphy and his invention of the Branly coherer
 James Britten (1846–1924) – botanist, member of the Catholic Truth Society and Knight Commander of the Order of St. Gregory the Great
 Hermann Brück (1905–2000) – Astronomer Royal for Scotland from 1957–1975; honored by Pope John Paul II
 Albert Brudzewski (c. 1445–c.1497) – first to state that the Moon moves in an ellipse

C

 Nicola Cabibbo (1935–2010) – Italian physicist, discoverer of the universality of weak interactions (Cabibbo angle), President of the Pontifical Academy of Sciences from 1993 until his death
 Alexis Carrel (1873–1944) – awarded the Nobel Prize in Medicine for pioneering vascular suturing techniques
 John Casey (mathematician) (1820–1891) – Irish geometer known for Casey's theorem
 Giovanni Domenico Cassini (1625–1712) – first to observe four of Saturn's moons and the co-discoverer of the Great Red Spot on Jupiter
 Augustin-Louis Cauchy (1789–1857) – mathematician who was an early pioneer in analysis
 Andrea Cesalpino (c.1525–1603) – botanist who also theorized on the circulation of blood
 Jean-François Champollion (1790–1832) – published the first translation of the Rosetta Stone
 Michel Chasles (1793–1880) – mathematician who elaborated on the theory of modern projective geometry and was awarded the Copley Medal
 Guy de Chauliac (c.1300–1368) – most eminent surgeon of the Middle Ages
 Michel Eugène Chevreul (1786–1889) – considered one of the major figures in the early development of organic chemistry; stated "Those who know me also know that born a Catholic, the son of Christian parents, I live and I mean to die a Catholic"
 Mateo Realdo Colombo (1516–1559) – discovered the pulmonary circuit, which paved the way for Harvey's discovery of circulation
 Arthur W. Conway (1876–1950) – remembered for his application of biquaternion algebra to the special theory of relativity
 E. J. Conway (1894–1968) – Irish biochemist known for works pertaining to electrolyte physiology and analytical chemistry
 Carl Ferdinand Cori (1896–1984) – shared the 1947 Nobel Prize in Physiology or Medicine with his wife for their discovery of the Cori cycle
 Gerty Cori (1896–1957) – biochemist who was the first American woman win a Nobel Prize in science (1947)
 Gaspard-Gustave Coriolis (1792–1843) – formulated laws regarding rotating systems, which later became known as the Corialis effect
 Domenico Cotugno (1736–1822) – Italian anatomist who discovered the nasopalatine nerve, demonstrated the existence of the labyrinthine fluid, and formulated a theory of resonance and hearing, among other important contributions
 Angélique du Coudray (c. 1712–1794) – head midwife at the Hôtel-Dieu, Paris, inventor of the first lifesize obstetrical mannequin, and author of an early midwifery textbook; commissioned by Louis XV to teach midwifery to rural women, she taught over 30,000 students over almost three decades
 Maurice Couette (1858–1943) – best known for his contributions to rheology and the theory of fluid flow; appointed a Knight of the Order of St. Gregory the Great by Pope Pius XI in 1925
 Charles-Augustin de Coulomb (1736–1806) – physicist known for developing Coulomb's law
 Clyde Cowan (1919–1974) – co-discoverer of the neutrino
 Jean Cruveilhier (1791–1874) – made important contributions to the study of the nervous system and was the first to describe the lesions associated with multiple sclerosis; originally planned to enter the priesthood
 Endre Czeizel (1935–2015) – discovered that folic acid prevents or reduces the formation of more serious developmental disorders, such as neural tube defects like spina bifida

D

 Gabriel Auguste Daubrée (1814–1896) – pioneer in the application of experimental methods to the study of diverse geologic phenomena
Peter Debye (1884–1966) – awarded the Nobel Prize in Chemistry in 1936 "for his contributions to our knowledge of molecular structure through his investigations on dipole moments and on the diffraction of X-rays and electrons in gases."
 Charles Enrique Dent (1911–1976) – British biochemist who defined new amino-acid diseases such as various forms of Fanconi syndrome, Hartnup disease, argininosuccinic aciduria and homocystinuria
 César-Mansuète Despretz (1791–1863) – chemist and physicist who investigated latent heat, the elasticity of vapors, the compressibility of liquids, and the density of gases
 Johann Peter Gustav Lejeune Dirichlet (1805–1859) – mathematician who contributed to number theory and was one of the first to give the modern formal definition of a function
 Peter Dodson (1946–) – American paleontologist at the University of Pennsylvania; co-editor of The Dinosauria, widely considered the definitive scholarly reference on dinosaurs
 Ignacy Domeyko (1802–1889) – Polish scientist who made major contributions to the study of Chile's geography, geology, and mineralogy
 Christian Doppler (1803–1853) – Austrian physicist and mathematician who enunciated the Doppler effect
 Pierre Duhem (1861–1916) – historian of science who made important contributions to hydrodynamics, elasticity, and thermodynamics
 Félix Dujardin (1801–1860) – biologist remembered for his research on protozoans and other invertebrates; became a devout Catholic later in life and was known to read The Imitation of Christ
 Jean-Baptiste Dumas (1800–1884) – chemist who established new values for the atomic mass of thirty elements
André Dumont (1809–1857) – Belgian geologist who prepared the first geological map of Belgium and named many of the subdivisions of the Cretaceous and Tertiary
 Charles Dupin (1784–1873) – mathematician who discovered the Dupin cyclide and the Dupin indicatrix

E

 John Eccles (1903–1997) – awarded the Nobel Prize in Medicine for his work on the synapse
 Stephan Endlicher (1804–1849) – botanist who formulated a major system of plant classification
 Bartolomeo Eustachi (c.1500–1574) – one of the founders of human anatomy

F
 Jean-Henri Fabre (1823–1915) – naturalist, entomologist, and science writer; "The Homer of Insects"
 Hieronymus Fabricius (1537–1619) – father of embryology
 Gabriele Falloppio (1523–1562) – pioneering Italian anatomist who studied the human ear and reproductive organs
 Mary Celine Fasenmyer (1906–1996) – religious sister and mathematician, founder of Sister Celine's polynomials
 Hervé Faye (1814–1902) – astronomer whose discovery of the periodic comet 4P/Faye won him the 1844 Lalande Prize and membership in the French Academy of Sciences
 Pierre de Fermat (1601–1665) – number theorist who contributed to the early development of calculus
 Enrico Fermi (1901–1954) – awarded the Nobel Prize in physics for his work in induced radioactivity
 Jean Fernel (1497–1558) – physician who introduced the term physiology
 Fibonacci (c.1170 – c.1250) – popularized Hindu-Arabic numerals in Europe and discovered the Fibonacci sequence
 Hippolyte Fizeau (1819–1896) – first person to determine experimentally the velocity of light
 Lawrence Flick (1856–1938) – American physician who pioneered research and treatment of tuberculosis
 Philip G. Fothergill FRSE (1908–1967) – British biologist and historian of science
 Léon Foucault (1819–1868) – invented the Foucault pendulum to measure the effect of the earth's rotation
 Joseph von Fraunhofer (1787–1826) – discovered Fraunhofer lines in the sun's spectrum
 Augustin-Jean Fresnel (1788–1827) – made significant contributions to the theory of wave optics
 Johann Nepomuk von Fuchs (1774–1856) – confirmed the stoichiometric laws and observed isomorphism and the cation exchange of zeolites

G

 Luigi Galvani (1737–1798) – formulated the theory of animal electricity
 Dorothy Annie Elizabeth Garrod (1892–1968) – archaeologist specialised in the Palaeolithic period
 William Gascoigne (1610–1644) – developed the first micrometer
 Riccardo Giacconi (1931–2018) – Nobel Prize-winning astrophysicist who laid the foundations of X-ray astronomy
 Paula González (1932–2016) – religious sister and professor of biology
 Peter Grünberg (1939–2018) – German physicist, Nobel Prize in Physics laureate
 Johannes Gutenberg (c.1398 – 1468) – inventor of the printing press
 Paul Guthnick (1879–1947) – astronomer who pioneered the application of photoelectric methods to the measurement of the brightness of celestial bodies

H
 Samuel Stehman Haldeman (1812–1880) – American naturalist and convert to Catholicism who researched fresh-water mollusks, the human voice, Amerindian dialects, and the organs of sound of insects
 Jean Baptiste Julien d'Omalius d'Halloy (1783–1875) – one of the pioneers of modern geology
 Morgan Hebard (1887–1946) – American entomologist who described over 800 new species of orthopteroids and compiled an entomological collection of over 250,000 specimens
 Eduard Heis (1806–1877) – astronomer who contributed the first true delineation of the Milky Way
 Jan Baptist van Helmont (1579–1644) – founder of pneumatic chemistry
 Karl Herzfeld (1892–1978) – Austrian-American physicist who provided the first fundamental explanation of the mechanism of the absorption of sound by molecules
 Victor Franz Hess (1883–1964) – Austrian-American physicist, and Nobel laureate in physics, who discovered cosmic rays.
 George de Hevesy (1885–1966) – Hungarian radiochemist and Nobel laureate
 Charles Hermite (1822–1901) – mathematician who did research on number theory, quadratic forms, elliptic functions, and algebra
 John Philip Holland (1840–1914) – developed the first submarine to be formally commissioned by the US Navy

I

J
 Antoine Laurent de Jussieu (1748–1836) – first to propose a natural classification of flowering plants

K
 Karl Kehrle (1898–1996) – Benedictine Monk of Buckfast Abbey, England; beekeeper; world authority on bee breeding, developer of the Buckfast bee
 Mary Kenneth Keller (c.1914 – 1985) – Sister of Charity and first American woman to earn a PhD in computer science, helped develop BASIC
 Annie Chambers Ketchum (1824–1904) – convert to Catholicism and botanist who published Botany for academies and colleges: consisting of plant development and structure from seaweed to clematis
 Marie-Victorin Kirouac (1885–1944) – Christian Brother and botanist best known as the father of the Jardin botanique de Montréal
 Brian Kobilka (1955–) – American Nobel Prize winning professor who teaches at Stanford University School of Medicine
 Karl Kreil (1798–1862) – meteorologist and astronomer who conducted important studies of terrestrial magnetism 
 Stephanie Kwolek (1923–2014) – chemist who developed Kevlar at DuPont in 1965

L

 René Laennec (1781–1826) – physician who invented the stethoscope
 Joseph Louis Lagrange (1736–1813) – mathematician and astronomer known for Lagrangian points and Lagrangian mechanics
 Jean-Baptiste Lamarck (1744–1829) – French naturalist, biologist and academic whose theories on evolution preceded those of Darwin
 Johann von Lamont (1805–1879) – astronomer and physicist who studied the magnetism of the Earth and was the first to calculate the mass of Uranus
 Karl Landsteiner (1868–1943) – Nobel Prize winner who identified and classified the human blood types
 Pierre André Latreille (1762–1833) – pioneer in entomology
 Antoine Lavoisier (1743–1794) – father of modern chemistry
 Claude-Nicolas Le Cat (1700–1768) – invented or perfected several instruments for lithotomy and was one of the first adherents of a mechanistic approach to physiology
 Georges-Louis Leclerc, Comte de Buffon (1707–1788) – one of the pioneers of natural history, especially through his monumental Histoire Naturelle
 Xavier Le Pichon (1937– ) – French geophysicist; known for his comprehensive model of plate tectonics, helping create the field of plate tectonics
 Jérôme Lejeune (1926–1994) – pediatrician and geneticist, best known for his discovery of the link of diseases to chromosome abnormalities
 Jacques Jean Lhermitte (1877–1959) – French neurologist and neuropsychiatrist; clinical director at the Salpêtrière Hospital
 André Lichnerowicz (1915–1998) – French differential geometer and mathematical physicist considered the founder of modern Poisson geometry
 Karl August Lossen (1841–1893) – geologist who mapped and described the Harz Mountains
 Jonathan Lunine (1959–) – planetary scientist at the forefront of research into planet formation, evolution, and habitability; serves as vice-president of the Society of Catholic Scientists

M
 William James MacNeven (1763–1841) – Irish-American physician and chemist who was an early proponent of atomic theory
 Juan Martín Maldacena (1968–) – Argentine theoretical physicist, first Carl P. Feinberg Professor of Theoretical Physics in the Institute for Advanced Study's School of Natural Sciences, and first proponent of AdS/CFT correspondence
 Marcello Malpighi (1628–1694) – father of comparative physiology
 Étienne-Louis Malus (1775–1812) – discovered the polarization of light
 Anna Morandi Manzolini (1714–1774) – anatomist and anatomical wax artist who lectured at the University of Bologna
 Giovanni Manzolini (1700–1755) – anatomical wax artist and Professor of anatomy at the University of Bologna
 Guglielmo Marconi (1874–1937) – father of wireless technology and radio transmission
 Luigi Ferdinando Marsili (1658–1730) – one of the founders of modern oceanography
 Pierre Louis Maupertuis (1698–1759) – known for the Maupertuis principle and for being the first president of the Berlin Academy of Science
 Michele Mercati (1541–1593) – one of the first to recognize prehistoric stone tools as man-made
 Charles W. Misner (1932–) – American cosmologist dedicated to the study of general relativity
 Kenneth R. Miller (1948–) – American cell biologist and molecular biologist who teaches at Brown University
 Mario J. Molina (1943–2020) – Mexican chemist, one of the precursors to the discovery of the Antarctic ozone hole (1995 Nobel Prize in Chemistry)
 Peter Joseph Moloney (1891–1989) – Canadian immunologist and pioneering vaccine researcher, who worked out the first large-scale purification of insulin in 1922; International Gairdner Award, 1967)
 Gaspard Monge (1746–1818) – father of descriptive geometry
 John J. Montgomery (1858–1911) – American physicist and inventor of gliders and aerodynamics
 Giovanni Battista Morgagni (1682–1771) – father of modern anatomical pathology
 Marston Morse (1892–1977) – inventor of Morse Theory, one of the original members of the Institute for Advanced Study
 Johannes Peter Müller (1801–1858) – founder of modern physiology
 Joseph Murray (1919–2012) – Nobel Prize in Medicine laureate

N
 John von Neumann (1903–1957) – Hungarian-born American mathematician and polymath who converted to Catholicism
Charles Nicolle (1866–1936) – French bacteriologist who received the 1928 Nobel Prize in Medicine for his identification of lice as the transmitter of epidemic typhus; came back to the Catholic Church at the end of his life
 Martin Nowak (1965–) – evolutionary theorist and Director of the Program for Evolutionary Dynamics at Harvard University; serves on the board of the Society of Catholic Scientists

O
Niall Ó Glacáin (c. 1563–1653) – Irish physician who worked to treat victims of bubonic plague outbreaks in various places throughout Europe. He was a pioneer in pathological anatomy.
 Karin Öberg (1982–) – her Öberg Astrochemistry Group discovered the first complex organic molecule in a protoplanetary disk; serves on the board of the Society of Catholic Scientists
 Abraham Ortelius (1527–1598) – created the first modern atlas and theorized on continental drift
 Jean-Michel Oughourlian (1940–) – Armenian-French neuropsychiatrist and psychologist; President of the Association of Doctors of the American Hospital of Paris; honorary member of the Association Recherches Mimétiques

P

 Blaise Pascal (1623–1662) – French mathematician, physicist, inventor, writer and philosopher
 Louis Pasteur (1822–1895) – father of bacteriology
 Christopher J. Payne (1988–) – biology professor at Malone University and long-term forest ecologist 
 Pierre Joseph Pelletier (1788–1842) – co-discovered strychnine, caffeine, quinine, cinchonine, among many other discoveries in chemistry
 Georg von Peuerbach (1423–1461) – called the father of mathematical and observational astronomy in the West
 Gabrio Piola (1794–1850) – Italian physicist and mathematician who made fundamental contributions to continuum mechanics
 Michael Polanyi (1891–1976) – Hungarian polymath, made contributions to physical chemistry, economics, and philosophy
 Giambattista della Porta (1535–1615) – Italian polymath, made contributions to agriculture, hydraulics, military engineering, and pharmacology
 Pierre Puiseux (1855–1928) – French astronomer who created a photographic atlas of the Moon

Q

R
 Santiago Ramón y Cajal (1852–1934) – awarded the Nobel Prize for his contributions to neuroscience
 Giancarlo Rastelli (1933–1970) – pioneering cardiac surgeon at the Mayo Clinic who developed the Rastelli procedure; he is a Servant of God in the Catholic Church
 René Antoine Ferchault de Réaumur (1683–1757) – scientific polymath known especially for his study of insects
 Francesco Redi (1626–1697) – his experiments with maggots were a major step in overturning the idea of spontaneous generation
 Henri Victor Regnault (1810–1878) – chemist with two laws governing the specific heat of gases named after him
 Gregorio Ricci-Curbastro (1853–1925) – one of the founders of tensor calculus
 Norbert Rillieux (1806–1894) – French-speaking Creole, one of the earliest chemical engineers and inventory of the multiple-effect evaporator
 Gilles de Roberval (1602–1675) – mathematician who studied the geometry of infinitesimals and was one of the founders of kinematic geometry
 Clemens C. J. Roothaan (1918–2019) – physicist known for developing the Roothaan equations
 Frederick Rossini (1899–1990) – Priestley Medal and Laetare Medal-winning chemist
 Paolo Ruffini (1765–1822) – Italian mathematician who contributed to the Abel–Ruffini theorem and described Ruffini's rule

S
 Paul Sabatier (chemist) (1854–1941) – awarded the Nobel Prize in Chemistry for his work improving the hydrogenation of organic species in the presence of metals
 Adhémar Jean Claude Barré de Saint-Venant (1797–1886) – remembered for Saint-Venant's principle, Saint-Venant's theorem, and Saint-Venant's compatibility condition; given the title Count by Pope Pius IX in 1869
 Theodor Schwann (1810–1882) – founder of the theory of the cellular structure of animal organisms
 Ignaz Semmelweis (1818–1865) – early pioneer of antiseptic procedures, discoverer of the cause of puerperal fever
 J. Wolfgang Smith (1930–) – mathematician, physicist, and philosopher of science
 George Sperti (1900–1991) – inventor of Preparation H hemorrhoid medication, the Sperti Ultraviolet Lamp, and Aspercreme; co-founder of the Institutum Divi-Thomae and of the Basic Science Research Laboratory of the University of Cincinnati
 Horatio Storer (1830–1922) – physician; founder of the Gynaecological Society of Boston, the first medical society devoted exclusively to gynecology; leader of the "physicians' crusade against abortion"
 Karl Stern (1906–1975) – German-Canadian neurologist and psychiatrist; lecturer in neuropathology and assistant neuropathologist at the Montreal Neurological Institute
 Miriam Michael Stimson (1913–2002) – American Adrian Dominican Sister, chemist, and the second woman to lecture at the Sorbonne; played a role in the history of understanding DNA
Jadwiga Szeptycka (1883–1939) – Polish archeologist and writer

T
 Louis Jacques Thénard (1777–1857) – discovered hydrogen peroxide and contributed to the discovery of boron
 Evangelista Torricelli (1608–1647) – inventor of the barometer
 Paolo dal Pozzo Toscanelli (1397–1482) – Italian mathematician, astronomer and cosmographer
 Richard Towneley (1629–1707) – mathematician and astronomer whose work contributed to the formulation of Boyle's Law
 Louis René Tulasne (1815–1885) – biologist with several genera and species of fungi named after him

U

V
 Máirin de Valéra (1912–1984) – Irish botanist, expert in phycology
 Louis Nicolas Vauquelin (1763–1829) – discovered the chemical element beryllium
 Urbain Le Verrier (1811–1877) – mathematician who predicted the discovery of Neptune
 Andreas Vesalius (1514–1564) – father of modern human anatomy
 François Viète (1540–1603) – father of modern algebra
 Leonardo da Vinci (1452–1519) – Renaissance anatomist, scientist, mathematician, and painter
 Vincenzo Viviani (1622–1703) – mathematician known for Viviani's theorem, Viviani's curve and his work in determining the speed of sound
 Alessandro Volta (1745–1827) – physicist known for the invention of the battery

W
 Wilhelm Heinrich Waagen (1841–1900) – geologist and paleontologist who provided the first example of evolution described from the geologic record, after studying Jurassic ammonites
 James Joseph Walsh (1865–1942) – dean and professor of nervous diseases and of the history of medicine at Fordham University; Laetare Medal recipient
 Karl Weierstrass (1815–1897) – often called the father of modern analysis
 Anna Wierzbicka (1938–) – linguist, founder of the Natural Semantic Metalanguage (NSM), based at the Australian National University (ANU), her research was cited more than 41,000 times  
 E. T. Whittaker (1873–1956) – English mathematician who made contributions to applied mathematics and mathematical physics
 Johann Joachim Winckelmann (1717–1768) – one of the founders of scientific archaeology
 Bertram Windle (1858–1929) – anthropologist, physician, and former president of University College Cork
 Jacob B. Winslow (1669–1760) – convert to Catholicism who was regarded as the greatest European anatomist of his day

X

Y

Z
 Antonino Zichichi (1929–) – Italian nuclear physicist, former President of the Istituto Nazionale di Fisica Nucleare
 Gregory Zilboorg (1890–1959) – Ukrainian-American psychiatrist and historian of psychiatry

See also 
 Catholic Church and science
 Christianity and science
 List of Catholic churchmen-scientists
 Society of Catholic Scientists
 List of Catholic clergy scientists
 List of Catholic priests and religious awarded the Nobel Prize

References 

Lists of Roman Catholics
Lists of Christian scientists
L
Catholic laity